Prehospital Emergency Care is a peer-reviewed medical journal that covers the practice, educational advancement, and investigation of pre-hospital emergency medicine and emergency medical services. It is published in collaboration with the National Association of EMS Physicians, National Association of State EMS Officials, National Association of EMS Educators, and the National Association of EMTs.

Editor-in-Chief 
The editor-in-chief is David C. Cone (University of Hawai'i).

References 

Publications established in 1997
Taylor & Francis academic journals
Emergency medicine journals